Chen Baosheng (born May 1956) is a Chinese politician and academic administrator. He currently serves as China's Minister of Education. He formerly served as the party chief and vice-president of the China National School of Administration and vice-president of the Central Party School.

Chen was born in Lanzhou, Gansu province. He has been a member of the Chinese Communist Party since 1984. He has degree from Peking University in political economics. He worked in Gansu province, working in policy research and economic development. He was the Party Secretary of Jiuquan prior to the area's conversion to a prefecture-level city. In April 2002 he was named to the provincial Party Standing Committee of Gansu, then became the head of the provincial propaganda department. In November 2004 he was named party chief of Lanzhou. In June 2008 he was transferred to Beijing to become vice-president of the Central Party School. On March 20, 2013, he became the party chief and vice-president of the China National School of Administration. On July 2, 2016, he was appointed as Minister of Education.

He has been an alternate member of the 17th Central Committee of the Chinese Communist Party and a full member of the 18th and the 19th Central Committees.

References 

Living people
1956 births
People from Lanzhou
Ministers of Education of the People's Republic of China
People's Republic of China politicians from Gansu
Chinese Communist Party politicians from Gansu
Peking University alumni
Alternate members of the 17th Central Committee of the Chinese Communist Party
Members of the 18th Central Committee of the Chinese Communist Party
Members of the 19th Central Committee of the Chinese Communist Party